Damita Jo is the eighth studio album by American singer Janet Jackson. It was released on March 30, 2004, by Virgin Records. The album takes its title from Jackson's middle name. Its music incorporates pop rock, electro, house, and hip hop styles, in addition to R&B. Its concept is based on Jackson's alternate personalities, exploring themes involving intimacy, monogamy, love, and dance. Its production is derived from producers including Dallas Austin, Scott Storch, BAG & Arnthor, Arnthor Birgisson, Rich Harrison, Télépopmusik, Just Blaze, and Kanye West; in addition to Jackson and Jam & Lewis.

The album was recorded over 18 months, the longest span of time Jackson had spent on a project. Jackson sought to find producers who identified with her emotions, intending "hard-hitting dance music". Producers declared it "a really sexy record" which was bold, fun, and positive. Multiple personae portrayed include the obstinate "Damita Jo" and lascivious "Strawberry Bounce". Jackson stated that they were "another way to express and expose a deeper part of me", comparing her writing process to that of a novelist; inventing characters with independent personalities. Jackson claimed that the aforementioned characters "absolutely" live inside of her, stating it "feels wonderful" to release them.

Prior to its completion, Jackson performed a medley of hits at the Super Bowl XXXVIII halftime show. The performance ended in Jackson's breast being exposed by surprise guest Justin Timberlake. Conglomerates involved with the broadcast who received massive fines by the U.S. Federal Communications Commission (FCC), including Viacom and CBS, and subsidiaries MTV and Infinity Broadcasting, enforced a blacklist of Jackson's singles and music videos, although Timberlake was unaffected. The album received generally favorable reviews. Jackson replied to critics focusing on the album's suggestive content and the Super Bowl incident in place of the music itself, stating she was "fascinated" by these interpretations, expressing concern for society's need to often place others within a specific sexual category. It garnered Jackson's second highest first-week sales in the US, and was certified platinum. Damita Jo sold over two million copies worldwide. It received a Grammy Award nomination for Best Contemporary R&B Album. Jackson was awarded several career accolades throughout its promotion. The album spawned four singles: "Just a Little While", "I Want You", "All Nite (Don't Stop)" and "R&B Junkie".

Background and development
Prior to recording, Jackson experienced massive success with All for You (2001). Lead single "All for You" peaked at number one for seven weeks in the United States, becoming the biggest hit of the year, and attained success internationally. The entertainer embarked on the All for You Tour, which garnered over twelve million viewers upon its broadcast on television network HBO. Jackson had also recorded the unreleased theme for the film Chicago. Jackson's personal life became a subject of media attention; in particular her rumored romances with actor Matthew McConaughey, recording artist Justin Timberlake, and producer Jermaine Dupri.

Jackson had considered postponing music for other career plans, but ultimately decided to record a new album. Jackson attempted several new musical styles; lyrically exploring her sexuality more explicitly and freely. A central theme of split personalities is incorporated within the content of several songs. Jackson stated "It shows the different sides of me, the different characters that I feel that I display at different moments in my life" [...] "I am divulging myself a little more on this album, and it's definitely much more intimate. That's another side of myself that people have seen, but not to this level." Comparing the process of producing to directing, Jackson searched for "sensitive people who can technically express what I'm going through emotionally" while seeking new collaborators. Jimmy Jam added: "Her albums are always what she's thinking at the moment." "Her thoughts may change six months from now. Her biggest thing is to be honest with her fans. Whatever stuff she wants to talk about, it's coming from her heart." Dallas Austin said "she always shows what's going on with her life through her records, reveals the phase she's in with her life and brings out that experience." Jackson's representative Stephen Huvane stated "Personally, she's not comfortable with being Janet in public [...] When she's performing, that's a different thing. We always planned that when the album came out, we would do the proper promotion." Producer Jimmy Jam commented: "Between albums she likes to go live life, recharge her batteries and be able to share her experiences. It not only raises her artistic level, she's able to talk about things she's going through – and other people can relate. That's one of the things that allows her to connect truly with the fans."

Alternate identities presented include "Damita Jo", an aggressive persona mentioned during the album's title track and "Sexhibition", and "Strawberry", a lascivious performer who emerges on "Strawberry Bounce". Speaking about the personae, Jackson said "She's another way to express and expose a deeper part of me." "Damita Jo" is "a lot harsher, and quick to put you in your place. She doesn't sit and ponder about stuff, where I'll go, 'Should I or shouldn't I?' She's tougher than I am. Then there's Strawberry. She's the most sexual of them all, the wildest." Blender magazine commented the latter identity represents "a time when she doesn't need to be the polite, professional Janet, and can turn into raw, unrestrained Strawberry." Jackson added "It's not an everyday indulgence. Not even every week. But every now and then I like playing around in that mode." Jackson said the characters "absolutely" live inside of her, exclaiming "it feels wonderful" to release them. The concept is further explored in "Looking for Love", in which Jackson says every individual is composed of "many people rolled into one", unified by a similar motive of seeking love, companionship, or identity.

Recording and production

For Damita Jo, Jackson worked with producers such as Télépopmusik, Dallas Austin, BAG & Arnthor, Kanye West, Scott Storch, and Babyface. The record saw Jackson liberated from recording exclusively with Jam & Lewis; which she had attempted upon recording with Rockwilder and The Neptunes for All for You. Jackson composed and co-produced all of the album's songs with the exception of two; writing with Cathy Dennis, Shelly Poole, INOJ, and then-upcoming artists Sean Garrett and John Legend. The album's early direction focused primarily on house music and electroclash. Planned collaborations with the Basement Jaxx, The DFA, and Richard X were announced, although the latter two did not come to fruition. Jimmy Jam stated, "It's kind of all over the place. We have some kind of up tempo dance house things, we have some funky down tempo things, a couple of real sensual ballads." Jon Platt, then-vice president of Virgin Records, commented, "The second half of the album was very easy once me and Janet got to know each other, and found the songs that really were true to her and that she can sing with conviction." An early report stated Jackson desired the record to be "edgy and experimental". Additional sessions with The Neptunes, Rich Harrison, Guy Chambers, Dre & Vidal, and Channel 7 took place, but were not included on the final release.

The album took eighteen months to complete, the longest Jackson had spent recording an album. Its initial stages of "hard-hitting dance music" were inspired by Zero 7 and Télépopmusik, who later produced the album's interludes. "Some of the songs have a definite sort of ambient quality to them," said producer Jimmy Jam. Jam added "There's some house stuff, which there always is [on her albums]." "There is going to be some more guitar-flavored things" [...] "happy up-tempo songs, the very funky tunes, the very sensual, sexy ballads." Dallas Austin considered it "easily the most sexy thing she's done." "To me, this is her Dirty Mind," Austin explained. "It's a really sexy record, but not in a sensual way. It's bold, it's fun, it's really positive. Nobody's sad, nobody's mad. It's just really fun songs where she happens to be talking frankly about sex." The sensual direction originated from the aura Jackson exuded to Austin while recording. "Guys won't know what to do with themselves after this," said Austin, laughing at the prospect. "It's one of the best records she's made." Then-newcomer Kanye West exclaimed his sessions with Jackson were "unbelievable", having previously expressed desire to collaborate. Songwriter Sean Garrett described being "starstruck", calling the session an "essential" part of his early career. "I thought working with Janet would change my life and it definitely did. [...] She was one of those people that I really wanted to work with." Anders Bagge of BAG & Arnthor commented "That's my dream, she's the one I would give anything to work with. The ultimate female artist," Arnthor Birgisson adding, "let's just say we will definitely be prepared if and when that happens."

Several collaborations were considered during the album's recording sessions, including duets with Pink and Gwen Stefani, who summoned Jackson's main producers Jam & Lewis for Love.Angel.Music.Baby during the same period Damita Jo was recorded. Jackson and Beyoncé planned to record a duet for the soundtrack of the film Shark Tale. Producers Jam and Lewis, who had recently worked with Beyoncé for The Fighting Temptations soundtrack, commented "Obviously we'd love to have the involvement of Janet and Beyonce. [...] They've already expressed interest." A report of Beyoncé wanting to use Jackson's vocals for Destiny's Child's fourth album Destiny Fulfilled later surfaced. Prior to Jackson's Super Bowl performance incident, Jackson and Justin Timberlake discussed potentially recording a duet for the album, as well as a rumored collaboration for a Quincy Jones album, though neither came to fruition. A sequel to prior duet "Scream" with Michael Jackson titled "We've Had Enough" was reported for Michael's forthcoming studio album shortly after the album's release, produced by Rodney "Darkchild" Jerkins. Jackson was approached to record a cover of "Signed, Sealed, Delivered I'm Yours" with English boy band Blue, but could not proceed due to scheduling conflicts. A re-release intended to include six new tracks was reportedly planned. During a radio interview, entertainment producer Jonathan Murray was rumored to confirm additional details, saying a collaboration with Usher was initially planned after Jackson had met with him in London. Murray was also rumored to reveal some of the new tracks would be produced by Jermaine Dupri in addition to Lil Jon, who confirmed working with Jackson on entertainment channel E! in July. It was scheduled for the fourth quarter of the year, however, the concept was seemingly canceled and plans were withdrawn.

Jackson worked with several producers not featured on the album, including the Basement Jaxx, The Neptunes, Rich Harrison, Just Blaze, Channel 7, Guy Chambers, Dre & Vidal, Makeba Riddick, Nisan Stewart, and Missy Elliott; as well as rumored sessions with Rodney "Darkchild" Jerkins. Additional songs with Dallas Austin, Télépopmusik, and Jam & Lewis were also not used. Sessions with The DFA, Richard X, Daniel Bedingfield, Mario Winans, and Diddy were planned but did not take place. Several unused songs have since leaked onto the internet. Two songs produced by Rich Harrison titled "Pops Up!" and "Speed it Up (Put it On Me)" were leaked along with "Love Me", a newly recorded urban remix of "Just a Little While" produced by Just Blaze. The latter two appeared on a Japan bootleg vinyl.
Other outtakes include "Could this Be Love", appearing on unofficial Russian pressings following "Like You Don't Love Me" and later used in the production of Usher's "Truth Hurts", and "Ruff", produced by The Neptunes. Jackson considered including "Ruff" on her tenth album Discipline. Two other demos produced with Harrison titled "Clap Your Hands" and "What Can I Say" also leaked. In December 2013, several demos were released via Tumblr; including demos of "SloLove" with an unused acoustic bridge and ending, and extended version with an instrumental breakdown and acoustic midsection, as well as demos of "All Nite (Don't Stop)" and "Put Your Hands On" with slightly altered production. Three unused songs produced with Dallas Austin are titled "Lucky Again", "Let it Go", and "If You Want Me To". An unused song titled "Almond Joy" was written with Nisan Stewart and likely produced with Missy Elliott. Jackson considered writing a song about the Super Bowl incident to express her concerns.

Music and lyrics
The album's lyrical content is divided between themes of love and romance, while also discussing lust and monogamous intimacy. An underlying theme of alternate personalities is explored, with Jackson's substitute personae "Damita Jo" and "Strawberry" appearing on several songs. Jackson explained the album shows several sides of her personality, as well as a "more private side"; saying "The album is about love[. ...] Damita Jo is one of the characters that lives inside of me." A producer stated Jackson had done "a lot of the writing and co-production", conceptualizing "a balance of a lot of different sides of Janet's personality." After Jackson's controversial Super Bowl performance incident, Jackson was urged to remove or tone down the suggestive lyrics of several songs, but resisted pressure to do so. "A lot of people had concerns and wanted me to take certain songs off the album, but I refused, because in doing so I wouldn't be who I am," said Jackson. "I'm not going to change, and that's fine. Either they like it, or they don't." Spliced between several songs are "mystifying" interludes consisting of brief autobiographical soliloquies regarding relaxation, astrology, and Karma; in which Jackson attempts to intimately communicate her inner thoughts with the listener.
Commenting on the album's themes Jackson said;

The album's opening monologue, "Looking for Love", serves as a prelude to the album's content of romance and passion. Jackson deciphers society's unification within the desire for affection in a breathy tone over a spatial and "dreamy" electronic backing: "So many different characters live within us – all looking for love." The florid discourse was considered "quasi spiritual" and "deeply sensual".
The second song, "Damita Jo", is composed of hip-hop and brittle funk. The instrumentation includes bells, cat calls, and rap inflected scratches, with "shyly sexual" vocals. Thematically, Jackson focuses on being misunderstood in the media, in "Do you think that I'm that person you watch on T.V.?", and the concept of a hidden personality. The song's "tricked-out" lyrics feature Jackson reflecting her different moods, in "sexy, quiet, shy, but down for a good time", and describe her alter persona, in "Miss Jackson don't, but Damita sure would."

"Sexhibition" is an electro-funk song composed of "cleverly crafted" verbal puns, delivered with "saucy assertiveness". The song opens with rattling tablas and stuttering guitars. In the lyrics, Jackson again sings from the point of view of "Damita Jo", in "intermittent vocal bubbles" to discuss the pleasures she intends to provide. Jackson states "Relax, it's just sex", at the song's closing. The fourth track, "Strawberry Bounce", depicts Jackson method acting a sensual display as alter ego "Strawberry". Characterizing herself as a one-woman gentleman's club, Jackson asks her partner to "Let me be your playground". The song morphs a sample of Jay-Z's vocals into its instrumentation of chimes, snapping rhythms, and synthesizers. Fusing new-school hip-hop with pop, Jackson sings "watch the way I pump it, the way it works is gonna keep you comin'", in a feverish pant. Jackson's looped chorus hook, and the song's "tasty" beat, were described to compose an "insanely catchy number", which merits repeats and "begs to be remixed, flipped, and stripped".

"My Baby" is a mid-tempo love song depicting a sonic valentine to Jackson's fiancé. The song features gentle acoustic guitars and shuffling percussion, and guest vocals from Kanye West, over "breezy" and "laidback" production. Jackson delivers the chorus in a reassuring manner; described as a "sotto voce purr". "The Islands" is a spoken-word segment in which Jackson confesses her admiration for the island of Anguilla, the beach, and tropical humidity. The interlude segues into "Spending time With You", a contemporary "slow jam". Lyrically, the song captures Jackson in a moment of love. Jackson speaks about evenings relaxing in prior said location in brief interlude, "Magic Hour", which transitions to "Island Life". In "Island Life", described as "pure seduction", Jackson refers to herself and a companion in an exotic paradise in a lilting vocal: "Island in the sun, just you and I will go/Ride into the wave like echo." Its instrumentation contains throbbing bass and light concoctions of Caribbean-influenced music and ragga pop.

"All Nite (Don't Stop)", the album's third single, contains elements of electropop and funk; incorporated with varied-instrumentation, including samba, grime, and Latin percussion.  The song talks about enjoying leisure time dancing at a club through lyrical metaphors: "Shake it 'til you're shaking the floor/Pop it like you're popping a cork/Don't stop, don't stop." The "ultra-sexy" song was, according to a review, primed to "fill dancefloors around the globe with its sultry groove and shocking lyrics."  Eleventh track "R&B Junkie" has a "retro" feel consisting of 1980s funk, dance-pop, and upbeat synths. It transforms a brief sample from Evelyn King into a new composition, considered a likely candidate for a summer club hit. The song's positive vibe was described as a sonic "ambrosia".

"I Want You" is a classic pop ballad influenced by Motown music of the 1950s and 1970s. The song's instrumentation includes a chime-studded texture, violins, heavy drums, and a girl-group arrangement over production described as an "electronic reconstruction". The "retro" song was likened to the music of Karen Carpenter, and has a "swooning charm". "Like You Don't Love Me" blends guitars and heavy bass with youthful vocals and a repeated chorus littered throughout. The lyrics talk about feeling neglected sexually, with Jackson encouraging her partner to role play as if they were not in a monogomous relationship: "You need to make love to me/Like you don't love me [...] Do me like you wanna do them other girls." The song ends with a spoken reprise of the album's title track's chorus.

The ballad "Thinkin' 'Bout My Ex" continues the album's transition into a distinctly slower tempo. Backed by acoustic guitars, Jackson displays humanity in the song's topic of longing for a former companion while in a new relationship. Jackson apologizes to her current partner: "When I'm holding you late at night/I'm thinkin' about my ex [...] And I know sorry doesn't mend your broken heart." The song's theme was considered "heartening" and a "crucial" culpability. "Warmth" is described as an "aural journey" in which Jackson performs oral sex on her partner while in a moving vehicle. Jackson again displays method acting; providing descriptive details of the event over swirling ambient guitars. Whispers and moans are heard, as Jackson compliments her companion, and performs with authority over the track's minimal "bass thump": "Just like the water from the shore/Let your rain pour [...] But nothing can compare to the warmth of my mouth." Jackson sings over the light sound of rain and thunder, representing climax and ecstasy. Jackson later clarified "There was something in my mouth" as it was recorded.

Grouped together in an "oral suite", the erotic tone continues on "Moist"; in which Jackson is on the receiving end of pleasure. The theme of "uncontrived" lust and soft vocals were compared to prior hit "Any Time, Any Place". Brief interlude "It All Comes Down to Love" sees Jackson describing love as truthful, honest, undeniable, sincere, and unforgettable. "Truly" is a love song with a stripped down and quiet production, backed by light guitars and strings. Jackson's vocal delivery was described as "beautiful". Interlude "The One" accompanies Jackson's final monologue of romance with flourishes of electronic music. "SloLove" is a deep house-influenced dance song with elements of jazz. Jackson talks about experiencing an intimate moment over a long period of time. In interlude "Country", Jackson speaks about her various nicknames and origin of her middle name while a country guitar twang is played.

The album's final track is lead single "Just a Little While", which opens with funk guitars and transitions into uptempo pop-rock. Jackson blends carnal and "dirty" intentions with innocent desires, and longs to be intimate with her partner again: "Can't stop thinking about the things we do/And how it feels making love to you [..] You know I'll take it anywhere/That you wanna go right now/Just love me for a little while." The song has been described as "push-button rock & roll" and the album's "most interesting, and energetic moment", although its placement as the last track was considered "odd".

The Japanese edition of the album contains two bonus tracks–"I'm Here" and "Put Your Hands On". In "I'm Here", Jackson convinces a companion she'll never abandon them and stops them from expressing negative thoughts: " I don't wanna hear you say/Your wall stands tall of stone/Because love harassed you with pain/You feel you'll grow old alone [...] Someone wanting to love you deeply/Won't you let me?" In "Put Your Hands On", Jackson sings of aligning with her lover's energy over a midtempo house beat.

Title and artwork
Damita Jo was titled after Jackson's middle name and one of her alternative personae shown on the album, which Jackson described as a "tougher" version of herself. Jackson previously desired to record an album which was a "complete departure" from what she is known for and title it after her middle name, but was convinced to use the title for the album by producer Dallas Austin. The title was initially used as self-acceptance, saying "My mother made up "Damita." I presumed "Jo" was for Joseph, my father, even though I later learned it wasn't. Because he was emotionally withdrawn, I was never comfortable using it. For years I didn't. Now I love being called Jo. I've come to the point where I'm trying to accept – even embrace – everything that has happened to me. I believe that without acceptance there's no serenity."

Jackson appears topless on the album's cover, visually representing the album's intimate and sensual theme. Jackson's representative commented "She just wanted a simple and youthful picture that she felt people would like. It's beautiful, soft. So far, fans love it", adding "web sites have been going crazy". The cover was shot by Andrew McPherson.

Release and promotion
Damita Jo was released on March 30, 2004, by Virgin Records; explicit and clean editions were released simultaneously. The album is Jackson's second to bear a Parental Advisory label, the first being All for You. The clean edition is heavily censored, removing all explicit and sexual content and omitting two songs entirely–"Warmth" and "Moist". Censoring is most notable in "Sexhibition" (which was retitled "Exhibition"), "All Nite (Don't Stop)" (in which several lines had been removed), and "Like You Don't Love Me" (where most of the chorus was omitted). Prior to its promotion, Jackson performed a medley of "All for You", "Rhythm Nation", and "The Knowledge" at the Super Bowl XXXVIII halftime show. Surprise guest Justin Timberlake arrived to perform a duet version of "Rock Your Body", which ended in Jackson's breast being accidentally exposed. The incident resulted in the U.S. Federal Communications Commission enforcing massive fines on conglomerates involved with the broadcast, including CBS, Viacom, and MTV, who then blacklisted Jackson on many radio formats and music channels worldwide as a result.

In March 2004, Jackson performed "Just a Little While" on various shows; including Top of the Pops, CD:UK, Channel 4, and Les Années Tubes. Jackson appeared on The Late Show with David Letterman, and 106 & Park. In Canada, Jackson performed "Just a Little While", "I Want You", and "All Nite (Don't Stop)" on Much on Demand, subsequently performing "All Nite (Don't Stop)" on Canada AM and The Tonight Show with Jay Leno. Jackson made an in-store appearance and signing at the HMV music store in Harlem, New York. On March 31, 2004, Jackson performed "All Nite (Don't Stop)" and "I Want You" on Good Morning America, and later on On Air with Ryan Seacrest. Jackson performed "All Nite (Don't Stop)" and "Strawberry Bounce" on Saturday Night Live; also participating in several skits. The episode was nominated for a Primetime Emmy Award. Jackson recorded a live performance for MSN, and performed "All Nite (Don't Stop)" and "All for You" at the annual Wango Tango concert.

Various celebrities attended the album's release party, including photographer Patrick Demarchelier, actress Lindsay Lohan, music executive L.A. Reid, and musicians Courtney Love, Hoobastank, Isaac Hanson, Patti LaBelle, Ja Rule, Angie Stone, Ice-T, and Brian McKnight. Other attendees included Coco Austin, Al Sharpton, Wendy Williams, Elisabeth Röhm, Matt Serletic, Lennox Lewis, the Z100 staff, Dan Abrams, Lady Bunny, Jai Rodriguez, Betsey Johnson, and Padma Lakshmi, among others. Gift bags for Virgin Records Presents Damita Jo: A Celebration with Janet Jackson included nearly $18,000 in merchandise, a membership to an exclusive gym and double-sided tape to keep clothing in place to avoid a wardrobe malfunction.  Jackson was presented a diamond Damita Jo nameplate necklace by label Virgin Records for the album's release.

Jackson taped a performance of "Just a Little While" for Hey! Hey! Hey! and made an unannounced appearance at the 2004 MTV Video Music Awards Japan to perform "All Nite (Don't Stop)". Jackson was awarded the "Inspiration Award" at the ceremony. Following this, Jackson traveled to Australia to appear on Network Ten and Rove Live. Jonathan Ross interviewed Jackson upon her return to the United Kingdom; later performing several songs at Italy's Festivalbar. In France, Jackson performed on Tout le monde en parle and Hit Machine on June 3, 2004, before performing on Top of the Pops, as well as Denmark's Bercy Anniversary Show and Gala Xacobeo in Spain. Upon returning to the United States, Jackson performed a medley of "All Nite (Don't Stop)" and "R&B Junkie" at the BET Awards 2004. Jackson made surprise performances of "All Nite (Don't Stop)" and "Together Again" at New York's Gay Pride March. Jackson appeared at several award shows throughout the campaign, but was barred from attending the Grammy Awards and MTV Video Music Awards following the Super Bowl incident. Later that year, Jackson released video compilation From janet. to Damita Jo: The Videos.

Jackson had initially confirmed a world tour in support of Damita Jo, stating: "I want to do something different, I have a few ideas and hopefully the fans will embrace it." The first date was planned for September 17, 2004. It was initially postponed due to Jackson focusing on the presidential election occurring within the same time period, commenting "we desperately need a Democrat as president"; as well as blacklisting from major companies regarding fines following Jackson's Super Bowl halftime show incident. After the election period, Jackson was approached to record her next studio album 20 Y.O. and postponed all plans for touring. One of the tour's several planned opening acts was Mario Winans, known for the hit "I Don't Wanna Know" with Enya. Janet would later perform songs from Damita Jo during her State of the World Tour, such as "Spending Time with You" and "Island Life".

Singles
Jackson released a promotional single "Janet Megamix 04" prior to the album's release. Three commercial singles were released from Damita Jo, although all were affected by the airplay and music channel blacklist following Jackson's controversial Super Bowl incident. "Just a Little While" was released as the lead single on February 2, 2004, after a premature leak. "Just a Little While" received highly positive reviews from critics, who felt its elements of rock and dance music would ensure success. Its airplay increased over five-hundred percent on its release, achieving "sizeable" downloads, but suffered when Jackson's blacklist was commenced by major radio broadcasters who were fined after Jackson's Super Bowl incident, affecting its performance worldwide. It reached number forty-five and within the top twenty in airplay in the United States, being her lowest peaking lead single since "Come Give Your Love to Me" over twenty years prior, though it peaked atop the Dance Club Songs chart. It held the top position for five weeks in Japan and was the year's second biggest international hit; also reaching number two in Belgium, three in Canada, and six in Spain. It also reached top ten in Hungary and top twenty in the United Kingdom, Australia, and Italy. The "UK Radio Edit" replaces guitars with synths and electronic beats. A re-recorded urban remix titled "Love Me" was produced by Just Blaze, initially planned for selected radio formats, but was withdrawn upon the radio boycott.

Music executives had shown interest in several potential singles, including "Sexhibition", "Island Life", "Thinkin' 'Bout My Ex", and "My Baby", which Jackson said was "a nice problem to have". Jackson considered "All Nite (Don't Stop)", "My Baby", or "R&B Junkie" as the album's lead before selecting "Just a Little While". "I Want You" was released on April 5, 2004. The blacklist persisted to affect the single's performances, as it peaked at number fifty-seven on the Hot 100 and the top twenty of the Hot R&B/Hip-Hop Songs chart. "I Want You" reached the top twenty in the United Kingdom, but was released as a double single with "All Nite (Don't Stop)" internationally, making it ineligible to chart in most markets. It was certified platinum by the Recording Industry Association of America (RIAA) and received a Grammy Award nomination. "All Nite (Don't Stop)" was issued as the album's third single on May 29, 2004. It received favorable reviews for its innovation and fusion of various musical styles. In a similar fashion, its airplay was affected by Jackson's blacklist. It charted on the Mainstream Top 40 at number thirty-three in July 2004, also charting within twelve other territories due to high single sales, notably reaching the top twenty in the United Kingdom, and top twenty-five in Australia, Belgium, and Romania. "All Nite (Don't Stop)" reached number one the Dance Club Songs chart, later declared "one of the biggest records this year in several different scenes" despite the airplay boycott due to its popularity. Music Week initially confirmed the fourth single to be "My Baby", a collaboration with Kanye West. On December 30, 2004, promotional single "R&B Junkie" became the album's fourth and final single. It was not regarded as an official single and did not have a music video or promotion. However, it received positive reviews and reached number one on the Bubbling Under R&B/Hip-Hop Singles chart. In April 2004, the album's title track and "My Baby" charted on the Bubbling Under R&B/Hip-Hop Singles chart without being released as singles, peaking at number seventeen and nine, respectively.

Critical reception

Upon its release, Damita Jo received positive to mixed reviews from most music critics. The album holds an average score of 53 based on 13 reviews on Metacritic. Jesse Washington of Associated Press commended Damita Jo as "sinfully appealing" and "infectious", saying "relaxation is the last thing on her agenda with this sinfully appealing concoction of infectious beats and scandalous lyrics." Washington added, "Such content isn't unusual in today's pop culture landscape, where cable TV's raunch is stealing viewers and awards from broadcast networks and the Cat in the Hat tells dirty jokes on movie screens." Jackson's voice was considered "sweet and frosting-light" among the record's "excellent tunes", specifying "We look for her to entertain us with excellent videos, saturate the radio with catchy tunes, and move our bodies in the club. Damita Jo" has the goods to do exactly that." USA Today rated the album three out of four stars, saying Jackson "isn't sweating it musically" despite negative publicity. The critique said Jackson "freely pursues her sexual and love fantasies", noting "If she ever seemed tentative in her erotic explorations in the past, she's completely self-assured here. [...] This is a happy, loving Jackson, as prone to romantic walks on the beach as to roadside quickies." Its premise of split personae was considered "a bit complicated", but clarified "that's who Damita Jo is". Jackson's new collaborators were said to induce a "freshening" effect while maintaining familiarity.

Rating it four out of five stars, Blender critic Ann Powers stated the album is "Artfully structured, unapologetically explicit, Damita Jo is erotica at its friendliest and most well-balanced. This hour-plus of Tantric flow even erases the memory of Jackson's clunky Super Bowl breast-baring." Powers added "Her lyrics, though hardly avoiding familiar sex talk, meld common exhibitionism with convincing intimacies. [...] Jackson brings bliss back to a subject that too many dirty-mouthed hotties have made tedious through overexposure." The album was also considered a "soul-baring, bedroom-eyed record" which was "swimming in pop hooks". Alexis Petridis of The Guardian rated Damita Jo four out of five stars, saying "Damita Jo's opening salvo is an object lesson in keeping things concise. Four tracks, each barely three minutes long, go hurtling past in a head-spinning blur of snapping rhythms, buzzing synthesized noise and oddly disconnected samples: cut-up vocals and glockenspiel on Strawberry Bounce, rattling tablas on Sexhibition. Elsewhere, there are impossibly lithe basslines - notably on All Nite (Don't Stop) and I Want You, an intriguing electronic reconstruction of an early 1970s soul ballad." Petridis heralded the record as "not only inventive, but brilliantly constructed", with nagging hooks and "explosive" choruses. Calling pop a "singles genre", Power's said "Damita Jo strike rate is remarkably high. It's triumphant stuff." Warner Bros. Publications declared the album "flirty, sensual, hot pop" in "traditional Janet style", adding "The slow grooves blend together and the seductive vocals express passion." Robert Christgau of The Village Voice said "Damita Jo starts off bold - But as the album proceeds it gets realer, mostly whispered softcore by the second half even when it's love songs per se. Call me immature, but I figure there's never enough good sex in the world. In a culture inundated with dirty pornos, Damita Jo is good sex."

Giving it three out of five stars, Sal Cinquemani of Slant Magazine criticized Damita Jo saying it featured "a slew of the gooey, structureless sex ballads that have become Janet's staple." Cinquemani also called the songs "Like You Don't Love Me" and "Moist" "two of the album's best." Entertainment Weekly rated it a 'C+' saying "The tracks, many produced by her longtime collaborators Jimmy Jam and Terry Lewis, have the sumptuous, homogenized creaminess we've come to expect from her." Angus Batey of Yahoo! Music UK gave it four out of ten stars, saying "Numerous explanatory spoken word asides seek to reassure us that Janet, as she approaches 40, is seeking love rather than reveling in lust." However, he called "R&B Junkie" "a delicious throwback, like a glorious 'Rhythm Nation'", "I Want You" "a peculiar post-modern waltz with a '40s supper club vibe, being the ear-catcher", and "All Nite (Don't Stop)" "another precision-tooled winner, with Jackson using an almost ethereal higher-pitched vocal delivery." Neil Strauss of Rolling Stone gave the album two out of five stars, saying Damita Jo "smacks of trying too hard. [...] the truth is that Jackson is just trying to humanize herself, as she did so well on her breakthrough 1986 album, Control [...] Jackson has had eighteen years of monster hits, so it's hard to fault her instincts. [...] but there's too much of Jackson's moistness to wade through to get to Damita Jo's solid ground." Stephen Thomas Erlewine of AllMusic said "while sex indisputably fuels much great pop music, it isn't an inherently fascinating topic for pop music – as with anything, it all depends on the artist. [...] Damita Jo proves that she was merely flirting with modesty, since it's as explicit as pop music gets." Ian Wade of BBC Music had mixed feelings, saying that "While there's nothing outwardly bad about Damita Jo, at 22 tracks over 65 minutes, your attention does start to wander and you almost forget it's playing. But after a third or fourth listen, the slick grooves of "Spending Time With You" and "Island Life" gain more identity. [...] Damita Jo heralds no real major leap forward, but it's no pig's ear either. A bit of editing and a couple of killer dance tracks would've made it even better."

Accolades

Commercial performance
Damita Jo achieved moderate commercial success, and was considered a "disappointment" in the media compared to Jackson's previous efforts. It sold 381,000 copies during its first week of release in the United States, debuting at number two on Billboard 200 behind Usher's Confessions. The album received a platinum certification from the Recording Industry Association of America (RIAA) within two months of release, on May 27, 2004. It was Jackson's first album not to reach number one in the U.S. since Dream Street in 1984. Damita Jo has sold 1,002,000 copies in the US. In Canada, it debuted at number seven with sales of 9,100 units, and at number ten in Japan with 27,510 copies sold. It was certified platinum by the Canadian Recording Industry Association (CRIA) and gold by the Recording Industry Association of Japan (RIAJ) for sales of 100,000 copies in each country. The album also reached number thirty-two on the UK Albums Chart, and was certified silver by the British Phonographic Industry (BPI) on April 2, 2004, denoting shipments in excess of 60,000 copies. It was certified gold by the Recording Industry Association Singapore (RIAS) in June 2004, and also peaked within the top twenty of Australia. It was the 15th best selling international album in South Korea, with 9,256 copies sold.

In total, Damita Jo has sold in excess of 3 million copies worldwide. Jackson's radio and music channel blacklist from major entertainment conglomerates massively affected the album's performance. Prior to the Super Bowl incident, Damita Jo was predicted to outsell predecessor All for You, which was certified double-platinum in US. Metro Weekly likened the album's performance to Madonna's American Life, saying after Madonna released the "biggest flop of her career", "It's doubtful Jackson planned the Super Bowl stunt to be quite the reveal it was. She also didn't count on the backlash, a backlash that has actually caused her the same fate as Madonna: public apathy to her music." Ernest Hardy of LA Weekly observed its first-week sales to be "far stronger than those of recent releases by Madonna, Britney, Whitney or J-Lo." Edna Gundersen of USA Today also said "Jo outpaced recent debuts by Madonna, Jennifer Lopez and Christina Aguilera." The New York Times commented; "The album is even sleeker and sexier than its predecessor, All for You, and in saner times, that would be enough to ensure its success."

Jackson stated: "Of course everyone wants to sell records and be number one. And I think that's important. But for a lot of artists today, it's all about the money as opposed to the art. What happened to artists creating this wonderful body of music that touches people and changes their lives?" In response to boycotted promotion, Jackson stated: "A lot of people said they didn't even know the project was out, and I think that had a lot to do with the response. Yet a lot of fans in Europe came up to me saying they absolutely felt it was my best album. There were all kinds of reactions to the album, and there was obviously a lot of drama surrounding that album as well." Productions deadlines also caused Jackson to rush, saying "Deadlines are hard for me; I don't like being forced to do things when you know you're not ready; when you're on the right path but you know you haven't gotten to the place you want to be."

Controversy

Following Jackson's controversial Super Bowl halftime show performance incident, conglomerates involved with the broadcast were heavily fined by the U.S. Federal Communications Commission (FCC) and taken to Supreme Court of the United States for several years. In retaliation, Viacom, owner of Super Bowl broadcaster CBS, MTV, and the radio station group Infinity Broadcasting, enforced a blacklist of Jackson's singles and music videos on their properties. The boycott was placed into effect prior to the release of Damita Jo, continuing throughout the course of Jackson's following two albums 20 Y.O. and Discipline. Justin Timberlake, who performed with Jackson during the incident, did not receive the same treatment. Glenn Gamboa of Newsweek stated "Unfortunately, it's not clear whether these songs will get heard," saying after the incident, "Jackson has been put in the pop culture penalty box. The result is that despite some initial backing for "Just a Little While," radio and TV support for her music has withered, as the conglomerates worry about angering the FCC and Congress" in fear of receiving fines for supporting Jackson. The excerpt added ""I Want You," for example, would have been an across-the-board smash pre-Nipplegate." A report uncovered Jackson to be "unfairly blackballed on pop radio stations and blacklisted on video shows", concluding "the "powers that be" are out to ruin her."

Lead single "Just a Little While" quickly became the most added and played song on pop formats, increasing nearly five-hundred percent in airplay and garnering "sizeable" downloads. It received positive reception, however, its performance massively shifted when the blacklist was commenced; virtually disappearing from airplay. The boycott drew attention from critics when providing commentary on the album.  Langston Wertz Jr. of The Charlotte Observer commented the incident made Jackson the "most  female artists of all time" in the media, adding "radio wouldn't play it and MTV wouldn't play her videos for "I Want You" and "All Nite," two songs that would've been out-of-the-park hits at any other point in Jackson's career." Billboard noted "The three singles it spawned were blacklisted by pop radio—they were also the albums biggest highlights—the electronic guitar studded "Just a Little While," Motown-influenced "I Want You" and the funky, heavily dance orientated "All Nite (Don't Stop)." Allan Raible of ABC News expressed "had the Super Bowl incident not happened, I have a feeling the rock-edged "Just a Little While" and the Kanye West assisted "Strawberry Bounce" would have been enough to make the album more of a success." Additionally, Doug Rule of The Metro Weekly revealed "the best tracks on Damita Jo are likely to be barred from commercial airtime" due to the blacklist, adding "in the case of first single "Just A Little While," never really get past go" as a result.

Music channels owned by Viacom, including MTV and VH1, refused to air Jackson's videos or only aired them in minor rotation following the incident, stated to be "a major catalyst" in the album's performance. Associated Press stated "MTV's "Spanking New" videos in heavy rotation include a gyrating, cleavage-baring Beyoncé [in "Naughty Girl"] and a bleeped-out Eminem with his group D12 ["My Band"]. Yet the sedate new video from Janet Jackson—a fixture on the cable channel for almost two decades and its first "MTV Icon"—has been absent from its playlist. Meanwhile, Jackson's name had barely been mentioned on MTV—unusual for a superstar whose previous projects have typically gotten heavy promotion." Jackson's collaborator Jimmy Jam commented "You can probably read between the lines with MTV. [...] I would guess that if MTV wanted to play it, they would, but this is just speculation on my part. It certainly could raise a few questions if you have an investigative mind." Jam also commented, "It's tough to click with audiences when you don't get support from the major media outlets. [...] It's interesting because the video was sent to Viacom – but somehow MTV didn't [receive it]?" Gossip blogger Roger Friedman of Fox News ridiculed the decision, stating "One thing is certain, however: Janet is being scapegoated for her Super Bowl "wardrobe malfunction." [...] Imagine that MTV, where illiteracy and lewdness thrive most of the day, would banish Janet's new video because of her "reputation." Who are they trying to kid? Of course, MTV is a corporate cousin of CBS, where the original snafu happened. But that's just a coincidence!"

Impact and legacy
Damita Jo was the first of Jackson's albums in the SoundScan era to miss reaching number one on the Billboard 200. However, it made Jackson the first female artist to have six consecutive studio albums debut within the number one or two position. Due to various blacklisting, the album is often considered to not have received proper recognition. The Daily Telegraph included Damita Jo among "120 Essential Pop Albums", commenting the "luscious lost 2004 classic is like dining on a seven-course meal  melted marshmallows"; also remarked to be "criminally underrated". The album's accolades including a Grammy nomination for "Best Contemporary R&B Album", and rank among Blender's "50 Greatest Albums" and VH1's "30 Hottest Naked Album Covers of All Time" in 2013.

Jesse Washington of Associated Press commended Jackson's output to remain "consistently good" and "eclipsing Michael's"; praising Jackson as equal to peer Madonna's: "For creating pop confections that you can grind to on the dance floor [...] Jackson remains up there with Madonna as one of the best ever. She's still relevant and compelling 22 years after her first album, and will probably remain so long after her right breast is forgotten." Spence D. of IGN declared; "There's no question that Jackson has the personality, the sensuality, and the voice to keep her at the top of the pop diva hierarchy." Stephen Thomas Erlewine of AllMusic likened the album to a "low-key make-out record" in the tradition of The Velvet Rope, praising its "strong rhythmic or melodic hooks." LA Weekly declared it "better than most reviews and word-of-mouth would have you believe", and "at least a minor-chord "F-you" victory to the wolves nipping at Janet's tits." Bob Smithouser of Plugged In considered the album's "bouncy rhythms, playful vocals and slick production values" to ultimately "draw countless teens into her tacky web of nymphomania." Tom Moon of The Inquirer stated, "Damita Jo will undoubtedly blaze new trails for artists seeking fame via salacious outlandishness." Kalefa Sanneh of The New York Times stated: "Ms. Jackson long ago established herself as one of the greatest and most consistent performers [...] – she hasn't released a dud album in 20 years," adding Damita Jo "continues that streak". Sanneh concluded, "Jackson has spent the better part of two decades using that whispery voice and that shy smile to keep some small part of herself hidden, even when she seems to be exposing herself. Maybe that's why she can still cause such a fuss. And maybe that's also how she's managed to last so long." Neil Strauss of Rolling Stone called the album "all things to all pop fans", ranging from "whiffs of classic Eighties Janet, teeny-bopper pop, a Nelly impression, old-school funk, push-button rock & roll, even a little country & western." Mikael Wood of The City Paper declared it Jackson's "most sonically sumptuous album" and an "explosion of finely finessed sound". Los Angeles Times praised its balance between "assembly-line product" and innovation in "more inspired commercial pop". Its production was said to span "decades of pop-music romance" by Blender, ranging from the "Motown sound" to "hip-hop's latest throwback beats". Wood defended Jackson's lyrical content: "the album's songs aren't any more moralistic than those by the frequently philandering male stars who get away with exposing their nipples all the time." However, Wood deciphered the album to be "more about love than lust", likened to "a nuzzle on the ear" and familiar comfort. Cromelin observed Jackson's vocal inflections to convincingly deliver "serviceable personas"; ranging from "haughty stripper to a wide-eyed kid who loves long walks on the beach."

The album's vocal production received prominent recognition. Jackson's layered "breathy harmonies", built upon "little countermelodies" and overdubbed "nonverbal asides", were considered an inventive technique; providing a "plush romance". Jackson's approach to "shrouded" harmonies were also thought to produce intimacy and comfort; which "makes even a relatively raw number like "Sexhibition" feel like a private moment between you and the owner of history's most downloaded breast." LA Weekly called Jackson's multilayered vocals her "calling card and primary weapon", backed by the album's lyrics as metaphorical "bullets". Robert Christgau regarded the "synth-dance" productions enhanced by "sensual background murmurs". Its vocals were described as "lovely" and "quite graceful", containing an "unassuming flutter and grit"; ultimately displaying a progression, saying "Jackson has grown into her voice along with the rest of her body."

Several critics observed the theme of Damita Jo to subsequently influence artists using similar concepts of alternate identities within album campaigns, regarding Jackson as the trendsetter in which singers "declare themselves in possession of multiple personalities". Britney Spears' Britney Jean was observed to be titled with influence from Damita Jo. ABC News Radio stated "taking a page from Janet Jackson's 2004 album, Damita Jo, Britney Spears has combined her first and middle names – Britney Jean – to come up with the title for her much-anticipated eighth studio album." Spears stated alternate persona Britney Jean lives inside her, in a similar means to Jackson expressing "Damita Jo is one of the characters that lives inside of me," also appearing topless on its cover. Logo's TheBacklot considered Spears' "How I Roll", appearing on Femme Fatale, to be influenced by the Damita Jo track "Strawberry Bounce". Spears was photographed listening to Damita Jo in April 2008 and included its title track in a playlist for iTunes, saying "I love to dance to this song. It has such a good beat to it." Spears played "All Nite (Don't Stop)" for the audience prior to each show on The Circus Starring Britney Spears tour, including it among her favorite songs for The X Factor publication X Magazine in 2010. Upon Katy Perry referencing Jackson's Super Bowl incident in the music video for "Last Friday Night (T.G.I.F.)", Perry's alternate persona "Kathy Beth Terry" was likened to Jackson's "Damita Jo".

Several critics observed Beyoncé's persona "Sasha Fierce" and I Am... Sasha Fierce album to be influenced by Damita Jo. The Sydney Morning Herald stated "When Janet Jackson released the album Damita Jo after the Super Bowl nipple furore, she told us that "Damita Jo is one of the characters that lives inside of me". And now Beyonce wants us to know that this album ... reflects how: "I have someone else that takes over when it's time for me to work and when I'm on stage, this alter ego that I've created kind of protects me and who I really am." The Courant commented "her musical forebear Janet Jackson is occasionally known as Damita Jo, so why shouldn't Beyonce have an alter-ego, too?". The rear artwork of Jennifer Lopez's Rebirth drew comparisons to Jackson's Damita Jo album cover, depicting Lopez topless in a similar pose amidst a white backdrop. Critics cited "Just a Little While" to influence Crystal Kay's "Busy Doing Nothing" and Jennifer Lopez's "Cherry Pie". The Washington Times likened Whitney Houston's "Like I Never Left", a duet with Akon, to being inspired by Jackson's "My Baby", which featured Kanye West. AllMusic compared the erotic tone of Jill Scott's "Crown Royal" to the album's suggestive content. Furthermore, Lil' Kim released a remix of the album's title track.

In People Magazine, Christina Aguilera stated "Damita Jo is a good album. I love that album. Janet never stops giving you what you want. She's an artist that will always be regarded as one of the best. Like Madonna, she's reinvented herself a lot and kept a connection with her audience. The whole Super Bowl thing ruined her reputation with the media and pretentious prudes, but who cares about them? She's still doing her thing." Actress Lindsay Lohan said she remained fit while filming Mean Girls by dancing to Jackson's Damita Jo album. Lohan had also attended the album's release party.

Track listing

Notes
  signifies a co-producer
  On clean versions of the album,  "Warmth" and "Moist" are not included due to explicit content and "Sexhibition" is re-titled as "Exhibition".

Sample credits
 "Strawberry Bounce" contains elements from "Can I Get A..." by Jay-Z featuring Amil and Ja Rule.
 "All Nite (Don't Stop)" contains elements from "Hang Up Your Hang Ups" by Herbie Hancock.
 "R&B Junkie" contains elements from "I'm in Love" by Evelyn King.
 "I Want You" contains elements of "Close to You" by B.T. Express.
 "Put Your Hands On" contains replayed elements from "The Message" written by Edward Fletcher, Sylvia Robinson, Melvin Glover and Clifton Chase.

Personnel

 Janet Jackson – vocals, backing vocals, production
 Dallas Austin – beats, keyboards, Line 6 guitar, production
 Bobby Ross Avila – bass, drums, guitar, keyboards, Moog lead, nylon guitar, production, Rhodes electric piano
 Babyface – instrumentation, production
 BAG & Arnthor – arrangement, engineering, production, programming
 Miri Ben-Ari – violin, violin arrangement, violin production
 Paul Boutin – engineering
 Billy Brown – backing vocals
 Henrik Brunberg – assistant engineering
 Jason Carson – engineering
 Fran Cooper – make-up
 Ian Cross – engineering
 Roger Davies – management
 Kevin "KD" Davis – mixing
 Freckles – backing vocals
 Brian "Big Bass" Gardner – mastering
 Jon Gass – mixing
 Şerban Ghenea – mix assistance
 Johnny Gill – guitar
 Lee Groves – programming
 Cesar Guevara – engineering assistance
 Stephan Haeri – mixing
 Rob Haggett – programming assistance
 Doug Harms – engineering assistance
 Terri Harris – personal assistance
 Jeri Heiden – art direction, design
 Steve Hodge – engineering, mixing, mix engineering
 Keenan "Kee Note" Holloway – bass
 Kameron Houff – engineering
 Kevin Hunter – guitar
 Jun Ishizeki – engineering
 Iz – bass, co-production, drums, electric guitar, guitar, horn stabs, Moog synthesizer, percussion, scratches

 Jimmy Jam – drum programming, drums, keyboards, percussion, production
 Glenn Jeffery – guitar
 Henrik Jonback – guitar
 Goran Kajfes – horn
 Brent Kolatalo – engineering assistance
 Ken Lewis – instrumentation
 Terry Lewis – production
 Wayne Scot Lukas – wardrobe
 Matt Marrin – mix engineering
 Manny Marroquin – mixing
 Andrew MacPherson – photography
 Glen Nakasako – art direction, design
 Big Jon Platt – A&R
 Ervin Pope – keyboards
 Joni-Ayanna Portee – backing vocals
 Magnum Coltrane Price – bass
 Tony Reyes – backing vocals, bass, Line 6 guitar
 Tim Roberts – mixing assistance
 Lindsay Scott – management
 Rick Sheppard – engineering, MIDI, sound design
 Xavier Smith – engineering assistance
 Mark "Spike" Stent – mixing
 Dana Stinson – production
 Scott Storch – production
 Télépopmusik – production
 Tony "Prof T" Tolbert – backing vocals
 David Treahearn – mixing assistance
 Rabeka Tuinei – mixing assistance
 Max Vadukul – photography
 Kanye West – vocals, production
 Colin Wolfe – bass
 Ghian Wright – engineering assistance, mixing assistance
 Bradley Yost – engineer assistance
 Janet Zeitoun – hair styling, styling

Charts

Weekly charts

Monthly charts

Year-end charts

Certifications and sales

Release history

References

External links
 Damita Jo video page at janetjackson.com 

2004 albums
Albums produced by Babyface (musician)
Albums produced by Dallas Austin
Albums produced by Jimmy Jam and Terry Lewis
Albums produced by Kanye West
Albums produced by Scott Storch
Janet Jackson albums
Virgin Records albums